Somogyudvarhely is a village in Somogy county, Hungary.

External links 
 Street map (Hungarian)
 Website of the village (Hungarian)
 Website of the village's primary school (Hungarian)

References 

Populated places in Somogy County